Bryant is an unincorporated community in Jackson County, Alabama, United States. At the 2000 census the population was 3,295.

Geography

Demographics
At the 2010 census, there were 3,582 people. The population density was 65.9 persons per square mile.  The racial makeup of the town was 95.6% White, 0.3% Black, 1.5% American Indian and Alaska Native, and 1.9% from two or more races. 1.3% of the population were Hispanic or Latino of any race.

In Bryant the population was spread out, with 23.2% under the age of 18 and 15.6% who were 64 years of age or older. Marriage status: 16.9% never married, 67.1% now married, 5.8% widowed, and 10.2% divorced.

The per capita income for Bryant was $20,113. About 13.7% of the population were below the poverty line.

Education 
Bryant is home to Bryant Elementary School, which is part of the Jackson County School System.

Bryant is also home to Mountain View Christian Academy, a private Christian school with Pre-school through 12th grade.

References

External links

Unincorporated communities in Jackson County, Alabama
Unincorporated communities in Alabama